Scrobipalpa grossoides is a moth in the family Gelechiidae. It was described by Povolný in 2001. It is found in Kazakhstan.

References

Scrobipalpa
Moths described in 2001